Indian Lake is a small lake located in Indian Lake Township, Nobles County. The lake is an oblong body of water that extends north-to-south for approximately 3/4 mile. The width is approximately 1/2 mile.

History
The lake was named Indian Lake due to the fact that settlers found Native Americans encamped along the lake's shores when they first arrived in 1869.  A dozen years earlier, a band of Indians led by Inkpaduta, the group responsible for the 1857 Spirit Lake Massacre, lived along the shores of the lake.  Indeed, the women and children of Inkpaduta's band were camped at Indian Lake when the massacre was taking place. Inkpaduta later fled westward, joining up with the Lakotas.  He became a close friend of Sitting Bull, and participated in the Battle of the Little Bighorn and the defeat of George Armstrong Custer.  It is believed that Inkpaduta died in Canada in 1881 or 1882.

Issac Horton, a pioneer settler, was the first to take up permanent residence along the shores of Indian Lake.  He had been renting a farm near Spirit Lake, Iowa and frequently came to the Indian Lake region to hunt elk. On May 6, 1869, he filed a preemption claim to the eastern half of section 34 of Indian Lake Township.  His claim included the eastern shore of Indian Lake.  He erected a cabin of logs cut from his claim, and resided there for 17 years.  Horton eventually sold his claim and purchased the southwest quarter of Indian Lake Township section 22 where he resided until his death in 1892.

Throughout the years, Indian Lake has remained entirely rural.  It is surrounded by farm land, and several farm families have built homes overlooking the lake.  Nobles County maintains one park, Hawkeye Park, along the shores of Indian Lake.

Fishing in Indian Lake

Despite being fairly shallow, Indian Lake is well-stocked with several varieties of fish. Black crappies and white crappies are the most common fish. White crappies range from 8.1 to 12.6 and average . Northern pike have only been stocked once (February 2001) in the last 14 years. A total of 12 species of fish have been sampled in Indian Lake, including bigmouth buffalo, black bullhead, black crappie, bluegill, common carp, freshwater drum, northern pike, walleye, white crappie, white sucker, yellow bullhead, and yellow perch.

Public access
Public access to Indian Lake can be found on the southwestern side of the lake at Hawkeye Park.  This park is maintained by Nobles County and consists of  developed and 35.7 undeveloped acres.  The park includes a paved boat ramp.

References

Lakes of Nobles County, Minnesota
Lakes of Minnesota